Jeremia Nambinga" (born December 13, 1946) is a Namibian Politician.

Life 
Since 2008, Nambinga has been a member of the Rally for Democracy and Progress (RDP); from 20152018, Nambinga was its president. A long-serving member of Swapo party, Nambinga was Deputy Minister of Home Affairs and a member of the National Assembly of Namibia beginning in 1995. In 2000 he was transferred to the Ministry of Prisons and Correctional Services where he served as Deputy Minister until 2004. For the following election period he almost missed his place in the National Assembly, being #56 on the SWAPO's party list with 55 seats won. He re-entered as backbencher when Philemon Malima retired soon after the election.

Nambinga resigned in November 2007 after being informally accused of being an "agent of imperialism" at a SWAPO party conference. In March 2008, Nambinga joined the newly formed Rally for Democracy and Progress (RDP). Prior to RDP's first general election in September 2009, Nambinga was placed at number 14 of 72 total names on the party list for the National Assembly. He became RDP's president in 2015. He was voted out of that position by a no-confidence vote in 2017 but challenged the result in court, and won. In August 2018 he resigned his presidency.

References

1946 births
Living people
People from Ohangwena Region
Politicians from Windhoek
Members of the National Assembly (Namibia)
Rally for Democracy and Progress (Namibia) politicians
SWAPO politicians
Government ministers of Namibia